The 1994–95 FR Yugoslavia Cup was the third season of the FR Yugoslavia's annual football cup. The cup defenders was FK Partizan, but was defeated by Red Star Belgrade in the quarter-finals. Red Star Belgrade has the winner of the competition, after they defeated FK Obilić.

First round

|}
Note: Roman numerals in brackets denote the league tier the clubs participated in the 1994–95 season.

Second round

|}
Note: Roman numerals in brackets denote the league tier the clubs participated in the 1994–95 season.

Quarter-finals

|}

Semi-finals

|}

Final

First leg

Second leg

Red Star won 4–0 on aggregate.

See also
 1994–95 First League of FR Yugoslavia
 1994–95 Second League of FR Yugoslavia

References

External links
Results on RSSSF
Former Yugoslav Soccer

FR Yugoslavia Cup
Cup
Yugo